Jean-Louis Xavier Trintignant (11 December 1930 – 17 June 2022) was a French actor. He made his theatrical debut in 1951, and went on to be regarded as one of the best French dramatic actors of the post-war era. He starred in many classic films of European cinema, and worked with many prominent auteur directors, including Roger Vadim, Costa-Gavras, Claude Lelouch, Claude Chabrol, Bernardo Bertolucci, Éric Rohmer, François Truffaut, Krzysztof Kieślowski, and Michael Haneke.

He made a critical and commercial breakthrough in And God Created Woman (1956), followed by a starmaking romantic turn in A Man and a Woman (1966), and The Great Silence (1968). He won the Silver Bear for Best Actor at the 1968 Berlin International Film Festival for his performance in The Man Who Lies and the Best Actor Award at the 1969 Cannes Film Festival for Costa-Gavras's Z. Trintignant's other notable films include, My Night at Maud's (1969), The Conformist (1970), Three Colours: Red (1994), and The City of Lost Children (1995). He won the 2013 César Award for Best Actor for his role in Michael Haneke's Amour.

Early life
Trintignant was born on 11 December 1930 in Piolenc, Vaucluse, the son of Claire (née Tourtin) and Raoul Trintignant, an industrialist. He grew up with the intention of studying law, but he soon discovered an interest in acting, and moved to Paris at the age of 20 to study drama, making his theatrical debut in 1951.

Career 
After touring in the early 1950s in several theater productions, his first motion picture appearance came in 1955, and the following year he gained stardom with his performance opposite Brigitte Bardot in Roger Vadim's And God Created Woman. Trintignant's acting was interrupted for several years by mandatory military service. After serving in Algiers, he returned to Paris and resumed his work in film. He had the leading male role in Claude Lelouch's film A Man and a Woman (Un homme et une femme, 1966), which was the most commercially successful French film internationally for some years.

In Italy, he was always dubbed into Italian, and he worked with Italian directors including Sergio Corbucci in The Great Silence, Valerio Zurlini in Violent Summer and The Desert of the Tartars, Ettore Scola in La terrazza, Bernardo Bertolucci in The Conformist, and Dino Risi in The Easy Life.

Throughout the 1970s, Trintignant starred in many films, including the English-language films The Outside Man in 1971 and Under Fire in 1983. Following this, he starred in François Truffaut's final film, Confidentially Yours, and reprised his best-known role in the sequel A Man and a Woman: 20 Years Later (Un homme et une femme, 20 ans dejà, 1986).

In 1994, he starred in Krzysztof Kieślowski's final film, Three Colors: Red. For the remainder of his career, he took an occasional film role but focused on stage work. After a 14-year gap, Trintignant came back to the screen for Michael Haneke's film Amour. Haneke sent Trintignant the screenplay, which had been written specifically for him. Trintignant said he chose film projects on the basis of the director and said of Haneke that "he has the most complete mastery of the cinematic discipline, from technical aspects like sound and photography to the way he handles actors". He worked with Haneke again in 2017 when he starred in Happy End.

On 20 July 2018, Trintignant announced his retirement from cinema, but, in March 2019, he accepted a role in Claude Lelouch's film The Best Years of a Life (Les plus belles annees d'une vie), a follow-up to A Man and a Woman and its sequel A Man and a Woman: 20 Years Later.

Personal life and death

Trintignant came from a wealthy family. He was the nephew of racecar driver Louis Trintignant, who was killed in 1933 while practising on the Péronne racetrack in Picardy. Another uncle, Maurice Trintignant (1917–2005), was a Formula One driver who twice won the Monaco Grand Prix as well as the 24 hours of Le Mans. Jean-Louis himself was an enthusiastic amateur rally driver and competed in a number of high-level rallies in the 1970s and 1980s, including several rounds of the World Rally Championship; he finished first in his class in the 1981 Monte Carlo Rally. Raised in and around automobile racing, Trintignant was the natural choice of film director Claude Lelouch for the starring role of a racecar driver in the 1966 film A Man and a Woman. He suffered a leg injury from a motorbike accident in June 2007.

His first wife was actress Stéphane Audran. His second wife, Nadine Marquand, was an actress, screenwriter, and director. They had three children: Vincent, Pauline (who died of crib death in 1969), and Marie Trintignant (21 January 1962 – 1 August 2003). At age 17 Marie performed in La terrazza alongside her father and later became a successful actress. She was killed at age 41 by her boyfriend, rock musician Bertrand Cantat, in a hotel room in Vilnius, Lithuania.

In 2018, Trintignant announced that he was diagnosed with prostate cancer and would not be seeking treatment. In November 2021, it was reported that he was gradually losing his sight and was in declining health. Trintignant died at his home on 17 June 2022, at the age of 91.

Filmography
Source:

Awards and honours

References

Jean-Louis Trintignant: 1930–2022". diariodelyaqui NEWS

External links

 Jean-Louis Trintignant biography on newwavefilm.com

 
 Jean-Louis Trintignant at New Wave Film

1930 births
2022 deaths
20th-century French male actors
21st-century French male actors
24 Hours of Le Mans drivers
Best Actor César Award winners
Best Actor Lumières Award winners
Cannes Film Festival Award for Best Actor winners
Deaths from cancer in France
Deaths from prostate cancer
European Film Award for Best Actor winners
French film directors
French male film actors
French male screenwriters
French male stage actors
French military personnel of the Algerian War
French screenwriters
Male Spaghetti Western actors
People from Vaucluse
Silver Bear for Best Actor winners
World Sportscar Championship drivers